The Sulak Canyon is a steep-sided deepest canyon in Europe carved by the Sulak River in Dagestan, Russia. It is 63 meters deeper than the Grand Canyon in the US and 620 meters deeper than the Tara River Canyon in Europe.

Geography
The canyon is the result of erosion which exposes one of the most complete geologic columns on the planet. Within this natural site, sediments of the Cretaceous, Jurassic and Tertiary periods come to the surface, in each of which ancient fossils are found. The Sulak canyon is located in the central part of Dagestan, in the valley of the Sulak river, some 100 km away from Makhachkala.

Flora and fauna

The Sulak canyon, is the largest nesting settlement in the Russian Federation of rare, listed in the Red Data Book, vulture birds such as: griffon vultures, and black vultures.

Plants
Some endemic, rare and poorly studied plant species, such as, horned sainfoin, have survived on the territory of the canyon.

Sulak Canyon tourism
Sulak Canyon is one of the premier natural attractions in Dagestan, attracting thousands of domestic and foreign visitors every year. The zip line in the canyon is a popular attraction amongst tourists.

References

Tourist attractions in Dagestan
Nature conservation in Russia
Environment of Russia
Canyons and gorges
Canyons and gorges of Europe
Canyons and gorges of Russia
Physiographic sections
Geography of Dagestan